Sporastatiaceae is a small family of crustose lichens in the order Rhizocarpales. It contains two genera, Sporastatia and Toensbergia, with a total of five species. Sporastatiaceae was circumscribed in 2013 by Mika Bendiksby and Ernst Timdal.

Description
Characteristics of species in family Sporastatiaceae include a crustose (crust-like) thallus with unicellular green algae as the photobiont partner, and lacking cephalodia. The apothecia are lecideine; this means they have a black exciple and blackish disc with a dark epihymenium. The ascus is narrowly club-shaped (clavate), containing several spores; it has a well-developed, deeply amyloid tholus (a thickened inner part of the apex). The ascospores are hyaline, and thin-walled, without a transparent coat (perispore) around them.

Genera
Sporastatia  – 4 spp.
Toensbergia  – 1 sp.

References

Lecanoromycetes
Lecanoromycetes families
Taxa described in 2013
Lichen families